Clube Desportivo Ngueto Maka is an Angolan sports club from the city of Uíge.
The team made its debut in the Gira Angola (Angola's second division championship) in 2016 after finishing second in the Uige province football championship.

Achievements
Angolan League: 0

Angolan Cup: 0

Angolan SuperCup: 0

Gira Angola: 0

Uige provincial championship: 0

League & Cup Positions

Manager history

Players

See also
Girabola
Gira Angola

References

External links
 Facebook profile

Association football clubs established in 2005
Football clubs in Angola
Sports clubs in Angola